Carlos Vargas may refer to:

Carlos Vargas (infielder) (born 1999), baseball infielder
Carlos Vargas (pitcher) (born 1999), baseball pitcher
Carlos Vargas (singer) (born 1984), American Dominican bachata singer, also known as Circharles. Previously part of Latin bachata duo Carlos & Alejandra 
Carlos Alonso Vargas (born 1999), Mexican footballer
Carlos Ayala Vargas (born 1980), Spanish politician
Carlos Cortés Vargas (1883–1954), Colombian general

See also
Carlos Vargas Ferrer (1971–2015), Puerto Rican politician
Jan Carlos Vargas (born 1995), Panamanian footballer